Sappho was an ancient Greek lyric poet from the island of Lesbos.  She wrote around 10,000 lines of poetry, only a small fraction of which survives.  Only one poem is known to be complete; in some cases as little as a single word survives.  Modern editions of Sappho's poetry are the product of centuries of scholarship, first compiling quotations from surviving ancient works, and from the late 19th century rediscovering her works preserved on fragments of ancient papyri and parchment.  Along with the poems which can be attributed with confidence to Sappho, a small number of surviving fragments in her Aeolic dialect may be by either her or her contemporary Alcaeus.  Modern editions of Sappho also collect ancient "testimonia" which discuss Sappho's life and works.

Textual history

Ancient editions

Sappho probably wrote around 10,000 lines of poetry; today, only 650 survive.  They were originally composed for performance, and it is unclear precisely when they were first written down.  Some scholars argue that books of Sappho's poetry were produced in or shortly after her own lifetime; others believe that if they were written down in that time, it was only as an aid to reperformance rather than as a literary work in their own right.

In the third or second century BC, Sappho's poems were edited into a critical edition by scholars in Alexandria.  This may have been based on an Athenian text of her poems, or one from her native island of Lesbos.  It is uncertain which of the Alexandrian scholars was responsible for the edition of Sappho; both Aristophanes of Byzantium and Aristarchus of Samothrace are reported to have produced editions of Alcaeus, and one or both of these may have been responsible for the Alexandrian edition of Sappho.

The Alexandrian edition of Sappho's poetry was divided into eight or nine books: the exact number is uncertain. Ancient testimonia mention an eighth book of the Alexandrian edition of Sappho; an epigram by  mentions nine books of Sappho, though it is not certain that he is referring to the Alexandrian edition.  These books were probably divided up by metre, as ancient sources tell us that each of the first three books contained poems in a single specific metre.  Information about the contents of the later books is less certain: the fourth book appears to have contained many poems in acephalous hipponacteans with double choriambic expansion, and possibly in other metres; the fifth book was metrically heterogeneous, with ancient sources mentioning the use of Phaelecian hendecasyllables and lesser asclepiads; of the sixth, nothing is known; a single couplet from the seventh book is preserved in Hephaestion but it is unclear whether this was an entire stanza or part of a three- or four-line stanza. Fragment 103 preserves 10 incipits of poems by Sappho, possibly from book 8, of which the first is in a different metre from the remaining nine; those nine may or may not all be in the same meter. A ninth book may have been made up of epithalamia in various meters, though many scholars are skeptical of the evidence for this, and consider that the book of epithalamia mentioned in ancient sources might have been the eighth book of the Alexandrian edition.

In addition to the Alexandrian edition, at least some of Sappho's poetry was in circulation in the ancient world in other collections. The Cologne papyrus on which the Tithonus poem is preserved was part of a Hellenistic anthology of poetry, and predates the Alexandrian edition.  Two fragments list opening lines of poems: Fr. 103 contains openings to ten of Sappho's poems, and Fr. 213C Campbell quotes openings to poems by Sappho, Alcaeus, and Anacreon; both might be related to anthological collections.

Loss and recovery

Today, most of Sappho's poetry is lost.  The two major sources of surviving fragments of Sappho are quotations in other ancient works, from a whole poem to as little as a single word; and fragments of papyrus, many of which were discovered at Oxyrhynchus in Egypt.  A few fragments survive on other materials, including parchment and potsherds.  The oldest surviving fragment of Sappho currently known is the Cologne papyrus which contains the Tithonus poem; it dates to the third century BC.

Though the Alexandrian edition of Sappho's poetry made the transition from papyrus rolls to the codex, while less popular authors were not reproduced in this new format, and a significant amount of her poetry survived until the seventh century, her work appears to have disappeared around the ninth century, and did not make the transition to minuscule handwriting. Sappho's poetry continued to be accessible only in quotations from other ancient authors, which, until printed editions of Greek texts began to appear in the Renaissance, would only have been accessible in manuscript form in monastic libraries. In 1508, a collection of Greek rhetorical works edited by Demetrios Doukas and published by Aldus Manutius made a poem by Sappho (the Ode to Aphrodite) available in print for the first time; in 1554, Henri Estienne was the first to collect her poetry when he printed the Ode to Aphrodite and the Midnight poem after a collection of fragments of Anacreon. The work of collecting quotations from Sappho from ancient sources culminated in Theodor Bergk's edition of the Greek lyric poets, whose second edition contained 120 fragments of Sappho and 50 testimonia.

The last quarter of the nineteenth century began a new period in the rediscovery of Sappho's poetry, with the discovery of a parchment fragment at Crocodilopolis (modern Faiyum) published by Friedrich Blass in 1880. From then until the publication of the "newest Sappho" in 2014, 24 papyri preserving texts of Sappho, and eight preserving related materials such as commentaries on her work, have been published. The most recent major editions of Sappho, by Edgar Lobel and Denys Page in 1955, and Eva-Maria Voigt in 1971, in conjunction with Lobel and Page's Supplementa Lyra Graeca, collect all of the material published by 1974; despite the publication of further papyrus fragments in 1997, 2004, 2005 and 2014, Voigt's remains the standard modern edition.

Poems
The fragments of Sappho's poems are arranged in the editions of Lobel and Page, and Voigt, by the book from the Alexandrian edition of her works in which they are believed to have been found.  Fragments 1–42 are from Book 1, 43–52 from Book 2, 53–57 from Book 3, 58–91 from Book 4; 92–101 from Book 5, 102 from Book 7, 103 from Book 8, and 104–117B from the Epithalamia.  Fragments 118–168 are those which Lobel and Page did not assign to any particular book, and are arranged alphabetically.  Fragment numbers with capital letters (such as 16A) were assigned by later editors to fit into Lobel and Page's numeration; lowercase letters indicate different parts of the same fragment.

Glosses
These fragments are isolated words quoted by other ancient authors, arranged alphabetically.

Testimonia
The testimonia are ancient accounts of Sappho, her life, and her poetry, which are conventionally included in critical editions of her work.  The selection included in these editions varies considerably.  Along with the seventy included in Voigt's edition, those given in Campbell's Loeb edition are listed here.

Uncertain authorship

Fragments where the authorship is uncertain.  In most cases, this is because the dialect is identifiable as Aeolic, but the poem may be by either Sappho or Alcaeus of Mytilene.

Spurious epigrams
According to the Suda, Sappho wrote epigrams and elegies.  Three epigrams in the Greek Anthology are attributed to Sappho, though none of them are authentic.  These are nonetheless included in Campbell's and Neri's editions.

Notes

References

Works cited
 
 
 
 
  
 
 
 
 
 
 
 
 
 
  
 
 
 
 
 
 
 
 
 
 
 
 
 
 
 
 
 
 

Ancient Greek poems
Lists of poems
Works by Sappho
Sappho